Bourbon County, Georgia was a county of the U.S. state of Georgia from 1785 to . The county was created by Georgia in 1785 as part of the Yazoo land scandal out of disputed Yazoo lands in present-day Mississippi and was dissolved in 1788 due to pressure from the federal government.

History 
In 1785, Georgia Governor George Mathews signed the Bourbon County Act, which organized Bourbon County, Georgia in the area east of the Mississippi River, south of the Yazoo River, east of various Native American lands and the north of the 31 degree parallel of latitude. At this time the western boundary of the State of Georgia was at the Mississippi River (per the 1763 Treaty of Paris). This area included part of the Natchez area and was also in part of an area that was also claimed by Spain. Bourbon County was created on February 7, 1785. 

Thomas Green attempted to assemble and organize Bourbon County, but Spanish authorities resisted his efforts to occupy the territory due to the fact that the county occupied area also claimed by Spain.

The State of Georgia appointed civil and judicial officers for the new county, but under pressure from the federal government, the Georgia General Assembly repealed the act creating Bourbon County on February 1, 1788, with the intent to reduce diplomatic tensions with Spain. The federal government opposed the existence of Bourbon County because of the unresolved Spanish claim, and because claims to the area by the Choctaw and Chickasaw Native American tribes had existed previously. 

It was believed that Bourbon County was named for the House of Bourbon, the European royal dynasty.

See also
 List of counties in Georgia
 Bourbon County, Kansas
 Bourbon County, Kentucky

References

Former counties of Georgia (U.S. state)
1785 establishments in Georgia (U.S. state)
1788 disestablishments in Georgia (U.S. state)
Pre-statehood history of Mississippi